The Democratic Choice of Russia (DVR; ; Demokraticheskiy vybor Rossii, DVR), before 1994 Choice of Russia Bloc (VR; ; Blok «Vybor Rossii», VR) was a Russian centre-right conservative-liberal political party. Later the party was self-disbanded and most members would merge into the Union of Right Forces.

Background and establishment
At the elections to the State Duma held on December 12, 1993, the Choice of Russia bloc (the predecessor to the Democratic Choice of Russia) received 15.51% of the vote, and consequently, 40 seats in the State Duma.

On January 20, 1994, having lost influence over making economic decisions and opposed to the increase of budget expenditure, the leader of the Choice of Russia, Yegor Gaidar, resigned from the government headed by Viktor Chernomyrdin. At that point the Choice of Russia lost its status as a pro-government faction, yet at the same time it continued to support president Boris Yeltsin and Chernomyrdin's government by providing constructive criticism of their policies.

On 12–13 June 1994, the founding meeting of the party Democratic Choice of Russia was held. At the meeting, the party's programme was adopted and its governing bodies were set up. Yegor Gaidar was elected as party chairman.

In 1995, the party contested the election in a coalition of (minor) like-minded groups, forming the Democratic Choice of Russia – United Democrats.

Later, in 2001, it merged into the Union of Rightist Forces.

Values
The party had valued ideas of both liberalism and conservatism. This included human rights, self-determination, a market economy, private capital investment, fair competition and the restriction of government regulations in the economy.

Election results

Presidential election

State Duma elections

References

See also
Democratic Russia
Popular Patriotic Party

Defunct political parties in Russia
Liberal parties in Russia
1994 establishments in Russia
Political parties established in 1994
Political parties disestablished in 2001